Mephistopheles, also known as Mephisto, is a demon featured in German folklore. He originally appeared in literature as the demon in the Faust legend, and has since become a stock character appearing in other works of arts and popular culture.

Etymology and name meaning
The name Mephistopheles is a corrupted Greek compound. The Greek particle of negation (μη, mē) and the Greek word for love or loving (φίλος, philos) are the first and last terms of the compound but the middle term is more doubtful. For the middle term, three meanings have been noticed and three different complete etymologies have been established: 
not loving light (φως το, phōs to; the old form of the word being Mephostopheles)
not loving Faust
allied to mephitic, a term which designates the poisonous vapors arising from the earth in certain places—pools, caverns, springs—destructive of human life. 

It is likely that the name was invented for the historical alchemist Johann Georg Faust by the anonymous author of the first Faustbuch.

Inside the Faust legend

Mephistopheles is associated with the Faust legend of an ambitious scholar, based on the historical Johann Georg Faust. In the legend, Faust makes a deal with the Devil at the price of his soul, Mephistopheles acting as the Devil's agent.

The name appears in the late 16th-century Faust chapbooks – stories concerning the life of Johann Georg Faust, written by an anonymous German author.

In the 1725 version, which Goethe read, Mephostophiles is a devil in the form of a greyfriar summoned by Faust in a wood outside Wittenberg.

From the chapbooks, the name entered Faustian literature. Many authors have used it, from Goethe to Christopher Marlowe. In the 1616 edition of Marlowe's The Tragical History of Doctor Faustus, Mephostophiles became Mephistophilis.

Mephistopheles in later treatments of the Faust material frequently figures as a title character: in Meyer Lutz's Mephistopheles, or Faust and Marguerite (1855), Arrigo Boito's Mefistofele (1868), Klaus Mann's Mephisto, and Franz Liszt's Mephisto Waltzes. There are also many parallels with the character of Mephistopheles and the character Lord Henry Wotton in The Picture of Dorian Gray by Oscar Wilde.

Interpretations

Although Mephistopheles appears to Faustus as a demon – a worker for Lucifer – critics claim that he does not search for men to corrupt, but comes to serve and ultimately collect the souls of those who are already damned. Farnham explains, "Nor does Mephistophiles first appear to Faustus as a devil who walks up and down on earth to tempt and corrupt any man encountered. He appears because he senses in Faustus' magical summons that Faustus is already corrupt, that indeed he is already 'in danger to be damned'."

Mephistopheles is already trapped in his own Hell by serving the Devil. He warns Faustus of the choice he is making by "selling his soul" to the devil: "Mephistophilis, an agent of Lucifer, appears and at first advises Faust not to forego the promise of heaven to pursue his goals". Farnham adds to his theory, "...[Faustus] enters an ever-present private hell like that of Mephistophiles".

Outside the Faust legend

William Shakespeare mentions "Mephistophilus" in The Merry Wives of Windsor (Act I, Scene I, line 128), and by the 17th century the name became independent of the Faust legend.

See also
Beelzebub
Devil in Christianity
Prince of Darkness
Satan
Mephiskapheles, Ska band whose name is a play on Mephistopheles
Mr. Mistoffelees, a character from the musical Cats
Servant

Notes

References

Bibliography

External links

 
 

Fictional demons and devils
Theatre characters
Characters in Goethe's Faust
Faust
Fictional tricksters
German folklore
Male literary villains
Supernatural legends
Deal with the Devil
Male characters in literature
Male characters in theatre
Devils
Medieval legends
Fictional characters introduced in the 16th century